The National University System of Taiwan (NUST) is a Taiwanese University alliance led by the National Chung Hsing University in Central Taiwan. NUST was approved by MOE on April and formally established on 8 November, 2021.

Members

History

Year founded

Academics

Admissions 

In response to the sub-replacement fertility and derived admissions problem, national universities which located in Central Taiwan proposed the establishment of "National University System of Taiwan" (NUST), in order to integrate academic resources, achieving higher competitiveness for each school. The NUST plans joint enrollment in future, like University System of Taiwan (UST) and Taiwan Comprehensive University System (TCUS), meanwhile allowed students inter-collegiate course taking, only if registration on one of the member school. 

All eleven NUST schools achieved high registration rate in 2021 academic year, nearly equivalent to approved quota by MOE.

Rankings

See also 
List of universities in Taiwan
University alliances in Taiwan
University System of Taiwan
Taiwan Comprehensive University System
ELECT
European Union Centre in Taiwan
University System of Taipei

References 

Educational institutions established in 2021
University systems in Taiwan
2021 establishments in Taiwan